Oxford Circle is a neighborhood in the lower Northeast section of Philadelphia, Pennsylvania, United States. Its namesake is the much used traffic circle at Roosevelt Boulevard and Oxford Avenue. 
The Oxford Circle neighborhood has traditionally included the areas up to Rhawnhurst and Mayfair but does not really have a fixed boundary other than in publications about Philadelphia which are of a public relations or informational nature.

Oxford Circle is also the colloquial name for the nearby Summerdale neighborhood, which is located west of Roosevelt Boulevard, opposite the city's Frankford section.  However, Summerdale is, for the most part, a different neighborhood than the one that is discussed in this article.

Geography/topography

Physical boundaries are: Roosevelt Boulevard on the southeast, Oxford Avenue on the west, and Cottman Avenue on the northeast. Oxford Circle's boundaries (including Castor Gardens) seem to have a general basis in the course of three creeks which were part of the landscape long before the development of the neighborhood. Most of Oxford Circle lies between these creeks. To the northwest was the Wissinoming Creek running from above Castor Avenue along Tyson Avenue and on towards Mayfair. To the east is the Pennypack Creek and to the southeast is the Tacony Creek (which is called "Tookany" north of the city and flows into Frankford Creek). As late as 1928, a branch of the Tacony called the Little Tacony Creek still flowed from Castor Avenue past Levick Street and Large Street and on to Roosevelt Boulevard.  This Little Tacony Creek connected into the main Tacony Creek which flows into the Delaware River near the site of today's Betsy Ross Bridge.

History 
Oxford Circle, along with Castor Gardens, Mayfair, and Tacony, was originally part of Oxford Township and was one of the early suburbs of Philadelphia.  The area, which included waterways such as the Tacony Creek and Wissinoming Creek, had been mostly utilized for farming up until the time that the land was sold off to developers just prior to World War II.  Most of the brick and stone row houses which characterize this neighborhood today were built by the Hyman Korman Company starting in the early 1940s and continuing into the 1950s. During that time and in the 1960s and 1970s Oxford Circle was a relatively prosperous white middle-class neighborhood and the majority of its residents were Jewish – either first or second generation Americans whose parents were born in Eastern Europe (see White flight).

Rising crime rates have dramatically changed the neighborhood since the late 1990s to early 2000s. Today's Oxford Circle is inhabited by a diverse population, including Caucasian, Jewish, Koreans, Hispanics (mostly Puerto Ricans, Dominicans, and Brazilians), West Indians (mostly Haitians), and African Americans. Oxford Circle is about 31% Black, 25% White, 32% Hispanic, and 11% Asian.

The Laura H. Carnell School, named for educator Laura H. Carnell, was added to the National Register of Historic Places in 1988.

Demographics 
According to the US Census of 2000 for the area of 19149. The demographics are as follows.

Source: U.S. Census Bureau, Summary File 1 (SF 1) and Summary File 3 (SF 3)

Government 
Oxford Circle is now predominantly represented in the state house by Jared Solomon. Others who represent parts of it in the legislature are Kevin Boyle and James Clay.  In the state senate, it is represented by Christine Tartaglione and John P. Sabatina Jr. Its city council members are Cherelle Parker, Bobby Henon and Maria Quinones-Sanchez.

Structures and landmarks 
Old Trinity Church
Tarken Playground
Jardel Playground
Max Myers Playground  
Northeast High School
Spruance, Carnell, and Moore Elementary Schools 
Fels Senior High School 
Woodrow Wilson Middle School
Castor Ave. (shopping district)  
Bushrod Library
Oxford Circle (traffic circle) 
Saint Martin of Tours Roman Catholic Church
Flagship location of Steve's Prince of Steaks

Residents 
Jerry Shore - Photographer
Patrick Coleman - Philanthropist
George Matysik - Activist
Sr. Mary Scullion - Co-founder, Project H.O.M.E.
Phyllis Kaniss - Media scholar

Public libraries 
Free Library of Philadelphia operates the Bushrod Branch at 6304 Castor Avenue at Stirling Street.

References

Neighborhoods in Philadelphia
Jewish-American history
Jews and Judaism in Philadelphia
Northeast Philadelphia